Tak Bolagh Angut (also Romanized as Tak Bolāgh Angūt; also known as Tak Bolāgh) is a village in Angut-e Sharqi Rural District, Anguti District, Germi County, Ardabil Province, Iran. At the 2006 census, its population was 229, in 44 families.

References 

Towns and villages in Germi County